Luis Manuel may refer to:
 Luis Manuel (footballer, born 1967), Spanish football centre-back
 Luís Manuel (footballer, born 1981), Portuguese football midfielder